Bee Ridge Township is an inactive township in Knox County, in the U.S. state of Missouri.

Bee Ridge Township was established in 1872, taking its name from Bee Ridge.

References

Townships in Missouri
Townships in Knox County, Missouri